The Man from Funeral Range is a lost 1918 American silent Western film directed by Walter Edwards and written by Monte M. Katterjohn and W.E. Wilkes. The film stars Wallace Reid, Ann Little, Lottie Pickford, Willis Marks, Tully Marshall, and George A. McDaniel. The film was released on October 6, 1918, by Paramount Pictures.

Plot

Cast
 Wallace Reid as Harry Webb
 Ann Little as Janice Williams
 Lottie Pickford as Dixie
 Willis Marks as Joe Budlong
 Tully Marshall as Frank Beekman
 George A. McDaniel as Mark Brenton
 Phil Ainsworth as Freddie Leighton
 Tom Guise as Colonel Leighton

Reception
Like many American films of the time, The Man from Funeral Range was subject to cuts by city and state film censorship boards. For example, the Chicago Board of Censors required cuts, in Reel 2, of the young woman shooting the man and, in Reel 4, two scenes of an attack on a guard.

References

External links 
 
 Progressive Silent Film List: The Man from Funeral Range at silentera.com
 lantern slide
 larger version of lantern slide

1918 films
1918 Western (genre) films
Paramount Pictures films
American black-and-white films
Lost Western (genre) films
Lost American films
1918 lost films
Silent American Western (genre) films
Films directed by Walter Edwards
1910s English-language films
1910s American films